Istishhad is the Arabic word for "martyrdom", "death of a martyr", or "heroic death". In recent years the term has been said to "emphasize... heroism in the act of sacrifice" rather than "victimization", and has "developed...into a military and political strategy", often called "martyrdom operations". One who martyrs themselves is given the honorific shaheed.

History
Muslim Acehnese from the Aceh Sultanate performed suicide attacks known as Parang-sabil against Dutch invaders during the Aceh War. It was considered as part of personal jihad in the Islamic religion of the Acehnese. The Dutch called it Atjèh-moord, which literally translates to Aceh murder. The Acehnese work of literature, the Hikayat Perang Sabil provided the background and reasoning for the "Aceh-mord" – Acehnese suicide attacks upon the Dutch, The Indonesian translations of the Dutch terms are Aceh bodoh (Aceh pungo) or Aceh gila (Aceh mord).

Atjèh-moord was also used against the Japanese by the Acehnese during the Japanese occupation of Aceh. The Acehnese Ulama (Islamic clerics) fought against both the Dutch and the Japanese, revolting against the Dutch in February 1942 and against Japan in November 1942. The revolt was led by the All-Aceh Religious Scholars' Association ( PUSA). The Japanese suffered 18 dead in the uprising while they slaughtered up to 100 or over 120 Acehnese. The revolt happened in Bayu and was centred around Tjot Plieng village's religious school. During the revolt, the Japanese troops armed with mortars and machine guns were charged by sword wielding Acehnese under Teungku Abduldjalil (Tengku Abdul Djalil) in Buloh Gampong Teungah and Tjot Plieng on 10 and 13 November. In May 1945 the Acehnese rebelled again.

The original Jawi script Acehnese language work Hikayat Perang Sabil (w:ace:Hikayat Prang Sabi, w:id:Hikayat Prang Sabi) has been transliterated into the Latin alphabet and annotated by Ibrahim Alfian (Teuku.) published in Jakarta. Perang sabi was the Acehnese word for jihad, a holy war and Acehnese language literary works on perang sabi were distributed by Islamic clerics ('ulama) such as Teungku di Tiro to help the resistance against the Dutch in the Aceh War. The recompense awarded by in paradise detailed in Islamic Arabic texts and Dutch atrocities were expounded on in the Hikayat Perang Sabil which was communally read by small cabals of Ulama and Acehnese who swore an oath before going to achieve the desired status of "martyr" by launching suicide attacks on the Dutch. Perang sabil was the Malay equivalent to other terms like Jihad, Ghazawat for "Holy war", the text was also spelled "Hikayat perang sabi". Fiction novels like Sayf Muhammad Isa's Sabil: Prahara di Bumi Rencong on the war by Aceh against the Dutch include references ro Hikayat Perang Sabil. 	Mualimbunsu Syam Muhammad wrote the work called "Motives for Perang Sabil in Nusantara", Motivasi perang sabil di Nusantara: kajian kitab Ramalan Joyoboyo, Dalailul-Khairat, dan Hikayat Perang Sabil on Indonesia's history of Islamic holy war (Jihad). Children and women were inspired to do suicide attacks by the Hikayat Perang Sabil against the Dutch. Hikayat Perang Sabil is also known as "Hikayat Prang Sabi. Hikayat Perang Sabil is considered as part of 19th century Malay literature. In Dutch occupied Aceh, Hikayat Perang Sabil was confiscated from Sabi's house during a Police raid on September 27, 1917.

In the Philippines the Moro Muslims are reported to have engaged in suicide attacks against enemies as early as the 16th century. Those who performed suicide attacks were called mag-sabil, and the suicide attacks were known as Parang-sabil. The Spanish called them juramentado. The idea of the juramentado was considered part of jihad in the Moros' Islamic religion. During an attack, a Juramentado would throw himself at his targets and kill them with bladed weapons such as barongs and kris until he himself was killed. The Moros performed juramentado suicide attacks against the Spanish in the Spanish–Moro conflict of the 16th to the 19th centuries, against the Americans in the Moro Rebellion (1899–1913), and against the Japanese in World War II. The Moro Juramentados aimed their attacks specifically against their enemies, and not against non-Muslims in general. They launched suicide attacks on the Japanese, Spanish, Americans and Filipinos, but did not attack the non-Muslim Chinese as the Chinese were not considered enemies of the Moro people. The Japanese responded to these suicide attacks by massacring all the relatives of the attacker.

The origins of modern Istishhadi attacks lie among the Shia in Iran during the Iran–Iraq War of 1980–1988.  Mohammed Hossein Fahmideh, a 13-year-old boy who fought in the war, is said to be the first Muslim to have participated in such an attack in contemporary history. He strapped rocket-propelled grenades to his chest and blew himself up under an Iraqi tank in November 1980. Ayatollah Khomeini declared Fahmideh a national hero and inspiration for further volunteers for martyrdom.  Other Iranian basij volunteers ran through minefields to detonate buried landmines and clear a safe battlefield path for following soldiers.

Shia usually refer to the martyrdom of Hussain ibn Ali and his companions and family members in the Battle of Karbala as role models and inspiration for martyrdom as a glorious and noble death.

When the Palestinian Islamist group Hamas first carried out suicide attacks – involved strapping the body of the mission carrier with explosives – in the Israeli-inhabited towns of Afula and Khidara in the spring of 1994, it "described these operations as `amaliyat istishhadiya (martyrdom operations)" rather than the more secular a'maliyat fida'iyah (self-sacrifice operations).  The term 'amaliyat istishhadiya has caught on and "today, istishhad is the most frequently used term to refer to acts of sacrifice in the Palestinian resistance and is used by Islamic, secular, and Marxist groups alike".

Zabiullah Mujahid, deputy minister of information and culture and spokesperson of the Islamic Emirate of Afghanistan announced the formation of an Istishhad battalion, which will be part of the Armed Forces of the Islamic Emirate of Afghanistan special forces. 

According to one scholar, Noah Feldman: "The vocabulary of martyrdom and sacrifice, the formal videotaped preconfession of faith, the technological tinkering to increase deadliness—all are now instantly recognizable to every Muslim." Feldman sees a worrying trend in the steady expansion of the targets of Istishhad since its debut in 1983 when successful bombing of barracks and embassy buildings drove the U.S. military out of Lebanon.

First the targets were American soldiers, then mostly Israelis, including women and children. From Lebanon and Israel, the technique of suicide bombing moved to Iraq, where the targets have included mosques and shrines, and the intended victims have mostly been Shiite Iraqis. The newest testing ground is Afghanistan, where both the perpetrators and the targets are orthodox Sunni Muslims. Not long ago, a bombing in Lashkar Gah, the capital of Helmand Province, killed Muslims, including women, who were applying to go on pilgrimage to Mecca. Overall, the trend is definitively in the direction of Muslim-on-Muslim violence. By a conservative accounting, more than three times as many Iraqis have been killed by suicide bombings in the last 3 years as have Israelis in the last 10. Suicide bombing has become the archetype of Muslim violence—not just to frightened Westerners but also to Muslims themselves.

The Chicago Project on Security and Terrorism recorded a total of 3,699 suicide attacks in over 40 countries from 1982 to 2013.

Martyrdom operation

Militant groups term attacks on military or civilian targets in which the attacker is expected to die, most frequently by detonation of a bomb, as "martyrdom operations". The term is usually used by Muslim militants, although non-Muslim groups, such as the Liberation Tigers of Tamil Eelam, have also engaged in suicide attacks. Islamist militants prefer the term "martyrdom operation" to "suicide attack", as suicide is forbidden under classical Islamic law.  While combat inherently involves a risk of death, a "martyrdom operation" implies a deliberate act leading to death as part of the attack.

Acts of istishhad are governed by Islamic legal rules associated with armed warfare or military jihad.  The rules governing jihad, literally meaning struggle but often called "holy war" by non-Muslims, are covered in exquisite detail in the classical texts of Islamic jurisprudence. In orthodox Islamic law, jihad is a collective religious obligation on the Muslim community, when the community is endangered or Muslims are subjected to oppression and subjugation. The rules governing such conflicts include not killing women, children or non-combatants, and leaving cultivated or residential areas undamaged.Bernard Lewis and Buntzie Ellis Churchill, Islam: The Religion and the People, Wharton School Publishing, 2008, pp. 145–153

For more than a millennium, these tenets were accepted by Sunnis and Shiites; however, since the 1980s militant Islamists have challenged the traditional Islamic rules of warfare in an attempt to justify suicide attacks despite clear contradictions to established Islamic laws.

Scholarship
Some Western and Muslim scholars of Islam find suicide attacks to be a clear violation of classical Islamic law. Nevertheless, the militant groups that carry out "martyrdom operations" believe that their actions fulfill the obligation of jihad, and  some clerics support this view.

Against suicide attacks

Suicide bombings as acts of terrorism have spurred some Muslims to provide scholastic refutations of suicide bombings and to condemn them. For example, Ihsanic Intelligence, a London-based Islamic think tank, published a study on suicide bombings that concluded, "suicide bombing is anathema, antithetical and abhorrent to Sunni Islam. It is considered legally forbidden, constituting a reprehensible innovation in the Islamic tradition, morally an enormity of sin combining suicide and murder and theologically an act which has consequences of eternal damnation".

Oxford-based Malaysian jurist Shaykh Afifi al-Akiti, issued his fatwa forbidding suicide bombing and targeting innocent civilians: "If the attack involves a bomb placed on the body or placed so close to the bomber that when the bomber detonates it the bomber is certain [yaqin] to die, then the More Correct Position according to us is that it does constitute suicide. This is because the bomber, being also the Maqtul [the one killed], is unquestionably the same Qatil [the immediate/active agent that kills] = Qatil Nafsahu [killing oneself, i.e., suicide]."

In January 2006, a Shiite marja cleric, Ayatollah al-Udhma Yousof al-Sanei decreed a fatwa against suicide bombing declaring it as a "terrorist act" and the Saudi grand mufti as well as other Sunni scholars similarly denounced suicide attacks regardless of their offensive or defensive characterization."Interview  with Christiane Amanpour", CNN, February 2007

Scholar Bernard Lewis states, "At no time did the classical jurists offer any approval or legitimacy to what we nowadays call terrorism. Nor indeed is there any evidence of the use of terrorism as it is practiced nowadays".  Similarly, Noah Feldman writes that the Islamic reasoning of suicide attackers is not convincing as martyrdom in Islam typically refers to another person killing a Muslim warrior, not the warrior pushing "the button himself".  In addition, "The killing of women and children has proved harder to explain away as a permissible exercise of jihad." This "illustrates the nature of the difficulty of reconciling suicide bombing with Islamic law".

As Charles Kimball, the University of Oklahoma's Director of Religious Studies, pointed out that Islam "clearly prohibits suicide" by citing "the hadith materials, which are the authoritative sayings and actions of the prophet, Muhammad, includes many unambiguous statements about suicide: one who 'throws himself off a mountain' or 'drinks poison' or 'kills himself with a sharp instrument' will be in the fire of Hell. Suicide is not allowed even to those in extreme conditions such as painful illness or a serious wound". Other Islamic groups such as the European Council for Fatwa and Research cite the Quran'ic verse Al-An'am 6:151 as a prohibition against suicide: "And take not life, which Allah has made sacred, except by way of justice and law". Dr. Hassan Ali El-Najjar says that the hadith unambiguously forbid suicide.

Proponents of suicide operations

Islamist militant organisations (including Al-Qaeda, ISIL, Hamas and Islamic Jihad) continue to argue that suicide operations are justified according to Islamic law."Fatwa of Sheikh Yousef Al-Qaradhawi" Irshad Manji, in a conversation with one leader of Islamic Jihad noted their ideology.

"What's the difference between suicide, which the Koran condemns, and martyrdom?" I asked. "Suicide," he replied, "is done out of despair. But remember: most of our martyrs today were very successful in their earthly lives." In short, there was a future to live for—and they detonated it anyway.

Another rationale provided for why istishhad is not against Islamic law is that the civilians caught in the crossfire "were destined to die". The Saudi exile Muhammad al-Massari explains that any civilian killed in an attack on the enemy "won't suffer [but instead]…becomes a martyr himself". During the 2006 Israel-Hezbollah war, Hezbollah secretary-general Hassan Nasrallah apologized for an attack on Nazareth that killed two Israeli-Arab children—but said the two children should be considered "martyrs".

Further justifications have been given by Iranian cleric Ayatollah Mohammad Taghi Mesbah Yazdi, "when protecting Islam and the Muslim community depends on martyrdom operations, it not only is allowed, but even is an obligation as many of the Shi'ah great scholars and Maraje', including Ayatullah Safi Golpayegani and Ayatullah Fazel Lankarani, have clearly announced in their fatwas". Ayatollah Ruhollah Khomeini of Iran showered those who performed martyrdom operations during the Iran–Iraq War and against Israel with accolades. Indeed, Sayyed Abbas al-Musawi, the second Secretary General of Hezbollah and student of Khomeini, created a supplication that became popular among the Hezbollah youths and fighters.

Other clerics have supported suicide attacks largely in connection with the Israeli–Palestinian conflict. Sunni cleric Yusuf al-Qaradawi has supported such attacks by Palestinians in perceived defense of their homeland as heroic and an act of resistance.  Shiite Lebanese cleric Mohammad Hussein Fadlallah, the spiritual authority recognized by Hezbollah, is reported to have similar views.

After the 7 July 2005 London bombings, journalist Mona Eltahawy published an op-ed in the Washington Post noting the fact that there were "22 imams and scholars who met at London's largest mosque to condemn the bombings but who would not criticize all suicide attacks", such as Sayed Mohammed Musawi, the head of the World Islamic League, who said "there should be a clear distinction between the suicide bombing of those who are trying to defend themselves from occupiers, which is something different from those who kill civilians, which is a big crime". After the knighting of Salman Rushdie in June 2007, Pakistan's acting Minister of Religious Affairs Muhammad Ijaz-ul-Haq publicly justified and called for a suicide attack against him.
 
There have been conflicting reports about the stances of Sheikh Muhammad Sayyid Tantawy (who was then the Grand Imam of Al-Azhar- he is now deceased) and Sheikh Ahmed el-Tayeb (who was then the Grand Mufti of Egypt and is now the Grand Imam of Al-Azhar). Shortly after the September 11 attacks Sheikh Tantawy issued a statement opposing suicide attacks. However, a translation from Al Azhar website quotes him as supporting suicide attacks on Jews in Israel as part of the Palestinian struggle "to strike horror into the hearts of the enemies of Islam". Yet, in 2003 he was quoted again as saying "groups which carried out suicide bombings were the enemies of Islam", and that all suicide attacks were sinful including those against Israelis. His comments condemning all suicide attacks were echoed by Malaysian Prime Minister Mahathir Mohamad and Lebanese cleric Husam Qaraqirah.

According to the Iranian Islamic theologian Mohammad-Bagher Heydari Kashani, "We had 36,000 student martyrs [in the Iran-Iraq War], 7,070 of whom were under the age of 14. [...] "They were a source of pride for us, and we must thank God for them."

Public opinion
In addition to the views of Muslim theologians, conflicting viewpoints are apparent among the public in Muslim-majority countries. As a reporter for The Guardian notes in an article written during the Second Intifada in August 2001, the Muslim world celebrates "martyr-bombers" as heroes defending the things held sacred. Polls in the Middle East in August 2001 showed that 75% of people had been in favor of martyr-bombings.

However, the Pew Research Center has found decreases in Muslim support for suicide attacks. In 2011 surveys, less than 15% of Pakistanis, Jordanians, Turks, and Indonesians thought that suicide bombings were sometimes/often justified. Approximately 28% of Egyptians and 35% of Lebanese felt that suicide bombings were sometimes/often justified.  However, 68% of Palestinians reported that suicide attacks were sometimes/often justified. In 2013, Pew found that "clear majorities of Muslims oppose violence in the name of Islam"; 89% in Pakistan, 81% in Indonesia, 78% in Nigeria, and 77% in Tunisia said that "suicide bombings or other acts of violence that target civilians are never justified".

See also

Notes

References

External links

 "The Culture of Martyrdom" How suicide bombing became not just a means but an end, by David Brooks in The Atlantic, June 2002
 "Defending the Transgressed", Fatwa against suicide bombing by Shaykh Muhammad Afifi al-Akiti
 "The Logic of Suicide Terrorism" by Bruce Hoffman published in The Atlantic'', June 2003
 "Suicide Bombers" : Why do they do it, and what does Islam say about their actions?
 "The Hijacked Caravan" Study refuting suicide bombing in Islam by Ihsanic Intelligence
 ‘The Seekers of Martyrdom Command’: Another State-Inspired Organization of Suicide Attackers in Iran (Official Website Based in U.S. and Germany)
 "The Supplication of the Second Secretary General of 'Hezbollah'"

Arabic words and phrases in Sharia
Islamic terminology
Sharia legal terminology
Suicide bombing
Terrorism tactics